Brown Creek Correctional Institution is a state men's prison in Polkton, North Carolina, first opened in July 1993 and operated by the North Carolina Department of Correction. 

Its official capacity is 1,204 inmates, one of the eight largest prisons in the state. From its opening through 2008, all prisoners were held in medium security; in December 2009, the facility was merged with the former Anson Correctional Center, which brought another three hundred Minimum Custody inmates.  

As of May 2016, state corrections officials announced a further consolidation. The Brown Creek facility is to be merged with the adjacent Lanesboro Correctional Institution, resulting in a Minimum Custody prison. The move is meant to address staffing challenges and the "checkered pasts" of both facilities.

References 

Prisons in North Carolina
Buildings and structures in Anson County, North Carolina
1993 establishments in North Carolina